Parmotrema mellissii is a widely distributed species of corticolous lichen in the family Parmeliaceae. It was first described by Carroll William Dodge in 1959 as a species of Parmelia. Mason Hale transferred it to the genus Parmotrema in 1974. The type collection was made in Saint Helena. Parmotrema mellissii has a pale yellowish-buff coloured thallus at least  in diameter, comprising rounded lobes about 15 mm wide and long. It has been found in the southern U.S.A., the Neotropics from Mexico to Colombia and Brazil, Africa (including the Canary Islands and Kenya), Asia (Japan, Laos, the Philippines), Australia and Oceania.

See also
List of Parmotrema species

References

mellissii
Lichen species
Lichens described in 1959
Lichens of Africa
Lichens of Asia
Lichens of Australia
Lichens of Central America
Lichens of North America
Lichens of the middle Atlantic Ocean
Lichens of South America
Taxa named by Carroll William Dodge